Westermannia elliptica is a species of moth of the family Nolidae first described by Felix Bryk in 1913. It is found in Taiwan, Borneo, Peninsular Malaysia and Sumatra.

Subspecies
Westermannia elliptica elliptica (Taiwan)
Westermannia elliptica rajata Kobes, 1988 (Borneo, Peninsular Malaysia, Sumatra)

References

Moths described in 1913
Nolidae
Moths of Japan